Czerwonków  is a village in Opole Voivodeship, Głubczyce County, Gmina Baborów. 

Villages in Głubczyce County